Chloe Alexandra Okuno (born August 1, 1987) is an American horror film director. She co-directed V/H/S/94 (2021). Her feature film directorial debut, Watcher, premiered at the 2022 Sundance Film Festival in the U.S Dramatic Competition. Okuno has also directed several short films, including Slut (2014). Slut won several awards, including the Jury Prize for Best Short Film at the Las Vegas International Film Festival.

Life and career
Okuno was born in Los Angeles and graduated from the University of California, Berkeley before graduating from the American Film Institute in 2014. In 2021, Netflix purchased Rodney & Sheryl, a drama directed by Okuno and based on a true story. However, in April 2022, it was revealed Netflix was no longer involved with the film, now renamed The Dating Game, which has been financed by AGC Studios and Vertigo Entertainment and is currently being sold to international distributors at the Marché du Film by AGC.

Her feature directorial debut, Watcher, premiered in the U.S Dramatic Competition category at the 2022 Sundance Film Festival. The film was acquired by IFC Films' horror film division IFC Midnight and horror streaming service Shudder for distribution in the United States, with AGC Studios later selling international distribution rights to Focus Features.

References

External links 
 

Living people
1987 births
American women film directors
Film directors from Los Angeles
University of California, Berkeley alumni
Writers from Los Angeles